ABC Futebol Clube, commonly referred to as ABC, is a Brazilian professional club based in Natal, Rio Grande do Norte founded on 29 June 1915. It competes in the Campeonato Brasileiro Série B, the second tier of Brazilian football, as well as in the Campeonato Potiguar, the top flight of the Rio Grande do Norte state football league.

ABC is the top ranked team from Rio Grande do Norte in CBF's national club ranking, at 44th overall.

History
At precisely 13 hours on June 29, 1915, a group of young men belonging to the elites of the state of Rio Grande do Norte met in Rio Branco Avenue, in the back of the Carlos Gomes Theatre, now known as the Alberto Maranhão Theatre, to decide about the creation of the first football club of the state. The club's foundation ceremony occurred in the house of Avelino Alves Freire, a respected merchant in the state.

The first subject to decide in the meeting was the name of the club. One of the founders, José Pinheiro, gives the idea of calling the new club as ABC Futebol Clube in which it was unanimously approved. The name ABC is given in honour of the pact of fraternal friendship which was diplomatically supported by three countries: Argentina, Brazil, and Chile, called the ABC Pact, whose letters refer to the initials of the three countries.

The team incorporated on December 13, 1927, when the state's football league registered the club charter.

ABC's first interstate match was in 1917, defeating Santa Cruz of Recife, Pernambuco 2–1.

ABC is in the Guinness Book for having won ten consecutive state championships from 1932 to 1941, sharing this record with América Mineiro, that won ten consecutive titles from 1916 to 1925. The team also is the team with the most state championship titles in Brazil, holding 57 titles.

In 1979, Rivelino played for ABC in a 1–1 friendly match against Vasco da Gama. In the same year ABC played against the Brazil Olympic team, losing 1–0.

The club won the Série C in 2010 after beating Ituiutaba in the final.

Stadium

The club owns Estádio Maria Lamas Farache, nicknamed Frasqueirão, which has a maximum capacity of 18,000.

Players
As of January 22, 2023

Honours
 Campeonato Brasileiro Série C
 Winners (1): 2010

 Campeonato Potiguar
 Winners (57): 1920, 1921, 1923, 1925, 1926, 1928, 1929, 1932, 1933, 1934, 1935, 1936, 1937, 1938, 1939, 1940, 1941, 1944, 1945, 1947, 1950, 1953, 1954, 1955, 1958, 1959, 1960, 1961, 1962, 1965, 1966, 1970, 1971, 1972, 1973, 1976, 1978, 1983, 1984, 1990, 1993, 1994, 1995, 1997, 1998, 1999, 2000, 2005, 2007, 2008, 2010, 2011, 2016, 2017, 2018, 2020, 2022

References

Enciclopédia do Futebol Brasileiro, Volume 1 – Lance, Rio de Janeiro: Aretê Editorial S/A, 2001.
Especial Placar – 500 Times do Brasil, São Paulo: Editora Abril: 2003.

External links

 Official site

ABC Futebol Clube
ABC
Association football clubs established in 1915
Natal, Rio Grande do Norte
1915 establishments in Brazil